"The Spell" is a song by Danish pop band Alphabeat, released as the lead single from their second studio album of the same name (2009). The song topped the Danish Singles Chart for four non-consecutive weeks and was certified platinum by IFPI Denmark on 4 January 2010, denoting sales in excess of 30,000 copies. The music video for "The Spell" was directed by Toben Seymour, who also directed the band's previous video, "What Is Happening".

Track listings
Danish digital single
"The Spell" – 3:39

UK CD single and 7" single
"The Spell" – 3:37
"The Spell" (Digital Dog Remix) – 2:49

UK digital single
"The Spell" – 3:37
"The Spell" (Digital Dog Remix) – 2:49
"The Spell" (Buzz Junkies Remix) – 3:27

Charts

Weekly charts

Year-end charts

Release history

References

2009 singles
2009 songs
Alphabeat songs
Fascination Records singles
Number-one singles in Denmark
Polydor Records singles